The 2010–11 Virginia Cavaliers men's basketball team represented the University of Virginia during the 2010–11 NCAA Division I men's basketball season. The team was led by head coach Tony Bennett, in his second season, and played their home games at John Paul Jones Arena as members of the Atlantic Coast Conference.

Last season
The Cavaliers improved in their first season under Tony Bennett, with a record of 16–15, and an in-conference record of 7–9.

Roster

Schedule 

|-
!colspan=9 style=| Exhibition

|-
!colspan=9 style=| Regular season

|-
!colspan=9 style=| ACC tournament

References

Virginia
Virginia Cavaliers men's basketball seasons
Virginia Cavaliers men's basketball team
Virginia Cavaliers men's basketball team